The table below lists the runners up (jun-yusho) in the top makuuchi division at official sumo tournaments or honbasho since the six tournaments per year system was instituted in 1958. The runner up is determined by the wrestler(s) with the second highest win–loss score after fifteen bouts, held at a rate of one per day over the duration of the 15-day tournament.

Names in italics mark a jun-yusho performance by a maegashira or lower ranked wrestler. Figures in brackets mark the number of jun-yusho earned up to that tournament for wrestlers who were runner up more than once. Those with a P after their name means they  were the runner up after a playoff.

Top division runners-up 1958 to present

Most top division runner-up performances

See also
List of sumo tournament top division champions
List of sumo tournament second division champions

References

tournament winners